Jingxi is a town under the administration of Wanyuan in eastern Sichuan, China. , it administers Yanyuan Community and the following eight villages:
Yanjingba Village
Luoxuantang Village
Xinchang Village
Maoping Village
Xiangshuidong Village
Huangshacao Village
Longwangba Village
Kengtang Village

References 

Township-level divisions of Sichuan
Wanyuan